Nawagai may refer to:

 Nawagai, Bajaur, Bajaur Agency, FATA, Pakistan
 Nawagai Tehsil, Bajaur Agency, FATA, Pakistan
 Nawagai, Buner, Buner District, Khyber Pakhtunkhwa, Pakistan